The Putney School is an independent high school in Putney, Vermont. The school was founded in 1935 by Carmelita Hinton on the principles of the Progressive Education movement and the teachings of its principal exponent, John Dewey. It is a co-educational, college-preparatory boarding school, with a day-student component,  outside Brattleboro, Vermont. Danny O'Brien became head of school in 2022. The school enrolls approximately 225 students on a  hilltop campus with classrooms, dormitories, and a dairy farm on which its students work before graduating.

Putney emphasizes academics, a work program, the arts, and physical activity. Its curriculum is intended to teach the value of labor, art, community, ethics, and scholarship for individual growth.

Campus

Most of the buildings on Putney's campus were partially or completely built by Putney students and faculty, with the exception of the most recent additions, the Michael S. Currier Center and the Field House. The Currier Center is a departure from Putney's customary white, colonial-style architecture, instead using stone and concrete walls in an angular design. It is used for dance, music, movie-making and visual-art presentations. The Field House, which opened in October 2009, was designed as a "net zero-energy building".

Academic program

In 1995, the Boston Globe described Putney as combining "a New England work ethic and a strong academic program." It is a member of the Independent Curriculum Group and in 2009 received a 10-year accreditation review by the New England Association of Schools and Colleges.

Notable alumni and faculty

Alumni
According to The Putney School 2008 Alumni Directory, alumni of The Putney School include (graduation date shown, where applicable):

 Sam Amidon, musician
 David Amram '48, composer
 Tim Asch '51, anthropologist, filmmaker
 Carlos Buhler '72, mountaineer
 Peter L. Buttenwieser, educator, philanthropist, member of the Lehman family
 Tim Caldwell, Olympic cross-country skier, son of John Caldwell
 Jonathan Crary, art historian
 Dave Cole '96, sculptor
 Carlton Cuse '77, television writer/executive of LOST
 Tim Daly '74, actor
 Alicia Dana '87, U.S. Paralympian
 Lydia Davis '65, writer, Man Booker International Prize recipient
 Thulani Davis '61, playwright, journalist, librettist, novelist, poet, and screenwriter
 Anna Dewdney '83, children's book author and illustrator
 Barnaby Dorfman '86, inventor, technology products
 Mahdi ElMandjra '50, Moroccan futurist, economist and sociologist
 Kai T. Erikson '49, sociologist
 David Griffiths '60, physicist, teacher
 William B. Gray, U.S. Attorney for Vermont
 Andrea Gruber, soprano
 William Hinton '36, author, agricultural advisor, People's Republic of China
 Joan Hinton '39, atomic physicist, dairy farmer in China
 Lee Hirsch '90, filmmaker.
 Jeffrey Hollender '73, CEO of Seventh Generation Inc.
 Reid Hoffman '85, web entrepreneur, co-founder of LinkedIn
 Felicity Huffman '81, actor
 Jeffrey Jones '64, actor
 Harper Simon '90, singer-songwriter, guitarist and producer and son of Paul Simon
 Kathleen Kennedy Townsend '69, lieutenant governor of Maryland
 Kerry Kennedy '77, lawyer and human rights activist
 Bill Koch '73, Olympic cross-country skiing medalist
 Steven Kunes '74, TV writer and producer
 Mike Ladd, hip-hop artist
 Jonathan Lash '63, Hampshire College president
 Ellen Hamilton Latzen '99, actor
 Téa Leoni (Pantaleoni) '84, actor
 Christopher Lehmann-Haupt, '52, journalist, critic, novelist
 J. Anthony Lukas '51, Pulitzer Prize-winning journalist and author
 Jared Martin, actor
 Sally Mann '69, fine-art photographer
 Joanna Miles '58, Emmy award-winning actress in The Glass Menagerie
 Adrian Morris, painter
 Errol Morris '65, filmmaker
 Nell Newman '78, co-founder/owner, Newman's Own
 Heather Nova '83, musician and songwriter
 Ken Olin '72 actor, director and TV producer
 Priscilla Paetsch '50, violinist, composer
 Bob Perelman '64, poet, literary critic and professor
 Jonathan Piel '57, science journalist, past editor of Scientific American
 Tyler Rasch '06, television personality
 Noel Rockmore '47, painter, portraitist
 Martha Rockwell '62, Olympic cross-country ski racer
 Jonathan Rosenbaum '61, film critic
 Demetria Royals, filmmaker
 Jonathan Schell '61, author
 Wallace Shawn '61, actor, playwright
 Lucy Shelton '61, soprano
 Alexis Stewart '83, television host, daughter of Martha Stewart
 Peter Willcox '72, Greenpeace activist, Arctic Sunrise captain
 Ellen Winner, professor specializing in the psychology of art
 John Bell Young, American concert pianist

Faculty 
Some Putney faculty members (subject taught in parentheses) had careers that extended beyond their teaching.
 Eric Aho (art), American painter
 John H. Caldwell (mathematics), Nordic skier on the U.S. Olympic Ski Team, author and Nordic coach of the U.S. Olympic Ski Team
 Chard deNiord (English, philosophy), Poet Laureate of Vermont
 Eric Evans (English) Olympic canoeist
 Fernando Gerassi (art), artist
 Peter C. Goldmark, Jr. (history), environmentalist, publisher, and executive
 Margarete Seeler (art), German-born American artist, designer, educator, and author

References

Further reading

External links
 Putney School web site
 The Association of Boarding Schools profile

Private high schools in Vermont
Boarding schools in Vermont
Preparatory schools in Vermont
Buildings and structures in Putney, Vermont
Educational institutions established in 1935
Schools in Windham County, Vermont
1935 establishments in Vermont